This is a list of characters featured in the 2003 Mexican telenovela, Amor real.

Cast

See also 
 Amor Real

References

External links 
 Official website 
 

Amor real
Amor real
Amor real